Luigi Teilemb (born 25 February 1992) is a Vanuatuan rower.  He competed for Vanuatu in the 2014 Commonwealth Rowing Championships and 2016 Summer Olympics men's single sculls.

References

External links
 

1992 births
Living people
Rowers at the 2016 Summer Olympics
Olympic rowers of Vanuatu
Vanuatuan male rowers